SALT is a French-American band that was formed in 2016 by producer Ken Stringfellow (guitar), Anton Barbeau (keyboards, lead vocals), and songwriter Stéphane Schück (guitar).

History 
Ken Stringfellow, a member of The Posies and Big Star, first came together with SALT's other founding members at Abbey Road Studios in London, during July 2015 recording sessions for Supercalifragile, the final album by Game Theory. Stringfellow was producing the posthumous album after the 2013 death of Scott Miller, who had founded Game Theory in the 1980s and The Loud Family in the 1990s. Miller had been a friend and musical collaborator with all three founding members of SALT, who had never previously met one another.  Stéphane Schück, a Paris-based physician specializing in public health and epidemiology, had co-written four of Supercalifragiles songs with Miller, and Miller had produced a demo recording by Schück's onetime band, Swan Plastic Swan.

When SALT was formed in 2016, multi-instrumentalist Anton Barbeau took on lead vocals and keyboard duties, alongside guitarists Stringfellow and Schück. Two of Schück's former bandmates, bass player Fred Quentin and drummer Benoit Lautridou, later joined the founding trio.

Barbeau and Stringfellow, both American expatriates, live in Berlin and Paris, respectively, and the group's debut album was rehearsed in both cities. The album, titled The Loneliness of Clouds, was recorded in Paris and in London at Abbey Road Studios. It was released in June 2019 on Beehive Records, Barbeau's label. The lyrics of its ten songs, all written by Schück, were "translated" by lead vocalist Barbeau from "heavily French'd English into a more standardized tongue."

Critical response 
In a Power Popaholic review, SALT was called "a power pop supergroup that skipped under the radar". Even prior to the release of SALT's first album, critic Bill Kopp of Musoscribe contemplated the term "supergroup" based on Stringfellow and Barbeau's distinctive musical histories. Kopp suggested: 

The Big Takeovers Michael Toland recommended the group to "aficionados of guitar-based melody and singalong choruses", adding that "songwriters Schück and Barbeau are plainly incapable of penning anything that doesn't have hooks". Toland described SALT's debut album as "a bucket of the kind of catchy, slightly psychedelic power pop you'd expect from these folks... Stringfellow uses his producer's seat to guide the tracks toward maximum melodic glory."

Babysue wrote, "With a lineup like this... you can bet there's no way things couldn't sound rather fantastic." Pointing to XTC, Game Theory, and The Beatles as the group's main influences, the reviewer added: 

In Stomp and Stammer magazine, Glen Sarvady called The Loneliness of Clouds "a solid set of lite psychedelia well suited for fans of the Paisley Underground or Dukes of Stratosphear. The harmony-rich mid-tempo procession gives equal play to guitars and keys, and when the tunes occasionally veer toward the homogeneous, Barbeau's quirks swoop in to clinch the deal."

References

External links 
 
 
 
 

Musical groups established in 2016
Power pop groups
French pop music groups
French indie rock groups
Psychedelic pop music groups